Domiporta praestantissima, the most superior mitre, is a species of sea snail, a marine gastropod mollusk in the miter snail family.

Description
The shell size varies between 20 mm and 61 mm.

Distribution
This species occurs in the Red Sea, in the Indian Ocean off Madagascar, Mauritius and the Mascarene Basin; in the Pacific Ocean off Polynesia
and off Japan.

References

 Drivas, J. & M. Jay (1988). Coquillages de La Réunion et de l'île Maurice
 Michel, C. (1988). Marine molluscs of Mauritius. Editions de l'Ocean Indien. Stanley, Rose Hill. Mauritius
 Poppe G.T. & Tagaro S.P. (2008). Mitridae. pp. 330–417, in: G.T. Poppe (ed.), Philippine marine mollusks, volume 2. Hackenheim: ConchBooks. 848 pp.

External links
 Gastropods.com : Domiporta praestantissima; accessed : 15 December 2010

Mitridae
Gastropods described in 1758
Taxa named by Carl Linnaeus